Nicolas Bochatay (August 27, 1964 – February 22, 1992) was a Swiss speed skier who died during the 1992 Winter Olympics. Bochatay was killed when he collided with a snow grooming vehicle on the morning of the speed skiing finals. He was the nephew of Olympic skier Fernande Bochatay.

Personal life
Bochatay, a carpenter, was twenty-seven years of age at the time of the accident. He was married and had two children. Fernande Bochatay, Nicolas' aunt, won the bronze medal in the women's giant slalom during the 1968 Winter Olympics held in Grenoble, France.

Skiing
The 1991 Swiss Champion, Bochatay was among the best speed skiers. Speed skiing was a demonstration sport at the 1992 Games, thus Bochatay's death was not considered as part of the official competition.

Accident and death
Around 9:30 am on February 22, the next-to-last day of competition at the 1992 Winter Olympics, Bochatay was warming up with teammate Pierre Yves-Jorand and United States team members Jeff Hamilton, Jimbo Morgan, and Dale Womack, when he crashed into a Snowcat used to groom snow on a public slope. The group was skiing and catching air on a bump in the slope. The group had made other runs on the trail. Nicholas was airborne before landing immediately in front of the groomer.

It was reported that he died of internal injuries immediately after impact.

According to organizers, the machine had flashing lights and a siren while it was sitting behind a small hill. The Swiss team said the machine had been immobile behind the hill and had no sirens or flashing lights. Jean-Albert Corrand, director general of COJO, was the one to say the snow groomer was using a siren and flashing lights and was moving uphill towards the skiers as they were coming down. Witnesses say also that the machine did have a siren and flashing lights. It was also said that Bochatay was wearing slalom skis and not speed-skis when he crashed. The accident occurred on the next-to-last day of the 1992 Winter Olympics, on the morning of the speed-skiing final. Bochatay was the third athlete to die at a Winter Olympics, after British luger Kazimierz Kay-Skrzypeski and Australian skier Ross Milne who both died at Innsbruck 1964.

References

1992 deaths
Swiss male alpine skiers
Olympic alpine skiers of Switzerland
Skiing deaths
Sport deaths in France
1964 births
Olympic deaths
Speed skiers at the 1992 Winter Olympics
20th-century Swiss people